The Chevrolet Astro I was a concept car created for 1967. The nose design of the Astro I was quite similar to the Mako Shark show car.

References 

Astro I
Cars introduced in 1967